The Leones de Yucatán (English: Yucatán Lions) are a professional baseball team in the Mexican League. The team play its home games at Parque Kukulcán Alamo in Mérida, Yucatán.

History

Mexican League premiere
The Leones de Yucatán were founded in 1954 under the leadership of Alvaro Ponce Vidiella and Humberto "Beto" Abimerhi Abimerhi. The team's entry to the Mexican League was announced on 5 January 1954. The team nickname is a reference to the name of the beer company built by the Ponce family. The Leones opened the season on 17 April at the newly built Carta Clara Park, hosting the previous season's champions, the Tecolotes de Nuevo Laredo, and earning an 8–0 victory. In its first year in the league, the Leones won 47 games and lost 32, with one tie, and finished in second place to the defending champion Tecolotes. The team ceased play after the 1958 season and the franchise moved to Veracruz in 1959.

Second version
After the 1969 season, filmmaker Manuel Barbachano Ponce, moved the Pericos de Puebla franchise to Mérida, renaming it the Leones. In the opening game of the 1970 season on March 18 the Leones beat the Rojos del Águila de Veracruz, 4–1. The franchise remained in Mérida for five seasons and then moved to Villahermosa, Tabasco, when Ariel "Picho" Magaña Carrillo purchased the team.

Third version
The third incarnation of the Lions began in 1979. On 6 April 1978, the Assembly of the Mexican League approved five expansion teams for the 1979 season. One of the expansion teams was awarded to Yucatán.

On 16 March 1979, the Leones officially returned to the Mexican League when they opened the season at the Cafeteros de Córdoba and lost 10–4. The Leones finished fifth in the Southern Division with 62 wins and 69 losses. Rookie pitcher Fernando Valenzuela, who later became a star in Major League Baseball, played for the Leones in 1979. Valenzuela had a win–loss record of 10–12 with an earned run average (ERA) of 2.42 and allowed only 70 walks while striking out 141 batters in 181 innings, catching the attention of the Los Angeles Dodgers with whom he would play from 1980 to 1990.

Rivalries

Piratas de Campeche
Since they began play in the Mexican League in summer 1954, the Lions have had fierce rivalries, first with the Mexico City Diablos Rojos and the Mexico City Tigres, and then from 1980 with the Campeche Piratas.

Retired numbers
1 Juan José Pacho
2 Luis "Rayo" Arredondo
3 Mercedes Esquer Llanes
4 Oswaldo Morejón
15 Juan Fernando Villaescusa Elías
17 Carlos Paz González
18 Ray Torres
19 Ricardo Conde Hernández
21 Héctor Espino González
29 Leonel Aldama Rossel

Roster

References

External links
  

Mérida, Yucatán
Mexican League teams
Baseball teams established in 1954
1954 establishments in Mexico
Sports teams in Yucatán